The WEY Latte is a compact luxury crossover SUV produced by Great Wall Motor under the premium brand, WEY.

Overview

The Latte was presented during the Shanghai Auto Show in 2021. Sales started in April 2021 at Auto Shanghai in the Mainland Chinese market. 

The crossover SUV is named after the latte coffee. With the Mocha and the Macchiato, two other vehicles of the brand named after coffee specialties were also presented at Auto Shanghai.

At the IAA in Munich in September 2021, Great Wall Motor presented the version for the European market as the Wey Coffee 02. From 2023, the model will also be marketed in Germany.

Powertrain
The Latte compact crossover is equipped with a 2.0-litre turbocharged inline-four engine code-named E20N. In terms of transmission, it is mated to a 9-speed wet dual-clutch gearbox developed inhouse by Great Wall. A 1.5 liter turbocharged inline-four engine with the Intelligent hybrid DHT technology is also available. The 1.5-litre turbo engine powertrain focuses on the economy of urban use scenarios, and supports working modes such as pure EV driving, hybrid drive, series drive, energy recovery and idle charging.

References

External links
Official website in Chinese

Mocha
Crossover sport utility vehicles
Compact sport utility vehicles
Plug-in hybrid vehicles
Front-wheel-drive vehicles
All-wheel-drive vehicles
Cars introduced in 2021
Cars of China